This is the list of ships built at Hietalahti shipyard in Helsinki, Finland, from yard number 401 onwards.

See also 
 List of ships built at Hietalahti shipyard (1–200)
 List of ships built at Hietalahti shipyard (201–400)

References

Bibliography 

Hietalahti 401